Palangan may refer to:
 Palangan, Hormozgan
 Palangan, Kurdistan